Euderces rubellus is a species of beetle in the family Cerambycidae. It was described by Henry Walter Bates in 1874 and is known from Central America, specifically from Guatemala and Nicaragua.

References

Euderces
Beetles of Central America
Beetles described in 1885
Taxa named by Henry Walter Bates